This article displays the qualifying for the singles tournament.

Players

Seeds

Qualifiers

Lucky loser
  Rik de Voest

Qualifying draw

First qualifier

Second qualifier

Third qualifier

Fourth qualifier

Fifth qualifier

Sixth qualifier

Seventh qualifier

Eighth qualifier

Ninth qualifier

Tenth qualifier

Eleventh qualifier

Twelfth qualifier

Thirteenth qualifier

Fourteenth qualifier

Fifteenth qualifier

Sixteenth qualifier

References
Qualifying Draw
2012 Australian Open Men's Qualifying
 2012 Australian Open – Men's draws and results at the International Tennis Federation

Men's Singles Qualifying
Australian Open (tennis) by year – Qualifying

ru:Открытый чемпионат Австралии по теннису 2013 в мужском одиночном разряде — квалификация